Spermageddon is an upcoming Norwegian adult computer-animated musical comedy film directed by Tommy Wirkola and Rasmus A. Sivertsen. The film consists of two plot lines, one focusing on a teenage couple having sex for the first time, and the other on Simon the Semen and his friends in quest for the Egg.

The film has been reported to be "in the veins of Sausage Party" and described by Wirkola as "both a road movie and an epic adventure ... much like Lord of the Rings". Producer Kjetil Omberg likened it to South Park and Checkered Ninja, saying it targets "elder kids and adults".

Production
In June 2021, the production was reported to begin "in the fall". It was in production as of May 2022.

Release
Spermageddon is set for release in 2023 by Nordisk Film. It was being sold for local distributors at the Marché du Film of the 2022 Cannes Film Festival by the international sales agent Charades.

References

External links
 

Upcoming films
2020s computer-animated films
Norwegian animated films
2020s sex comedy films
2020s musical comedy films
Adult animated comedy films
Films about puberty